"Go Back" is a song recorded by American country music artist Chalee Tennison. It was released in November 2000 as the first single from the album This Woman's Heart. The song reached No. 36 on the Billboard Hot Country Singles Tracks chart. The song was written by Jeremy Campbell and Donny Hackett.

Content
The song is a ballad where a trucker is being told on three separate occasions to "go back" to someone important. In the last verse, he is in an accident while on the way to visit his daughter, and has a near-death experience where angels to tell him "go back".

Critical Reception
A review in Billboard praised the song's "affecting lyric", Tennison's singing voice, and the "pretty melody".

Chart performance

References

2000 singles
2000 songs
Chalee Tennison songs
Asylum Records singles
Songs about truck driving